Peter Robert Kennaugh MBE (born 15 June 1989) is a Manx former professional racing cyclist, who rode professionally between 2010 and 2019 for  and . In 2012 he won the gold medal as part of the Great Britain Team Pursuit team at the 2012 Summer Olympics, becoming the first Manxman in 100 years to win gold. On 5 April 2019, he announced that he was taking an indefinite break from professional cycling to focus on his mental health.

Career

Early life and career
Born in Douglas, Isle of Man, Peter's younger brother Tim, and their father are also cyclists. Peter's mother Jackie also cycled and formerly held the Isle of Man's 10-mile time trial record. He began cycling competitively in BMX at the age of 6. Kennaugh attended school at St Ninian's.

He became a member of British Cycling's Olympic Academy in 2008, moving with the rest of the squad to live in Tuscany, Italy. In 2008 he came second in the senior national road race championships thus becoming the British under 23 champion. In February 2009 he became the British madison champion partnering Mark Christian.

On 9 September 2009, it was announced that Kennaugh would turn professional in 2010, riding for the new British professional . He was described by Cycling Weekly as "the most talented youngster to roll off the Isle of Man production line since his friend and star sprinter Mark Cavendish".

Team Sky (2010–17)

2010

In 2010, he focused on track cycling, winning the individual pursuit and scratch race at the national track championships. He finished second to Sky teammate Geraint Thomas in the national road race championships. Kennaugh made his grand tour debut in the Vuelta a España, but Sky withdrew following the death of soigneur Txema Gonzalez.

2011
In 2011, Kennaugh was a last minute replacement for Serge Pauwels in the Giro d'Italia, and finished 86th in his first Giro. Kennaugh finished third overall in the Route du Sud, but was not selected for the 2011 Tour de France. He came in third behind teammates Bradley Wiggins and Geraint Thomas in the national road race championships. In August, he finished fifth overall in the Tour de Pologne.

2012
In 2012, he began focusing on track cycling. He was part of the four-man Great Britain pursuit team that set a new world record time of 3:53.295 seconds to win gold in the track world championships on 4 April 2012 in Melbourne. That achievement however was bettered on 3 August when he formed part of the Team GB pursuit team alongside Ed Clancy, Geraint Thomas, Steven Burke, that not only took Gold at the Summer Olympics but, with a time of 3:51.659, shattered their own world record that they had set in qualifying. Kennaugh was the first Manxman to win an Olympic gold since 1912.

Kennaugh was appointed Member of the Order of the British Empire (MBE) in the 2013 New Year Honours for services to cycling.

2013

Kennaugh focused fully on the road in 2013. He played a supporting role in Chris Froome's overall victory at the Tour of Oman in February. Kennaugh was part of the Sky team that won the team time trial at the Giro del Trentino in April, but he was not selected to ride the Giro d'Italia. Instead, Kennaugh won the Lincoln Grand Prix before playing a key role as a mountain domestique as Froome and Richie Porte took a 1–2 overall in the Critérium du Dauphiné in June. He was selected to ride the Tour de France for the first time. On Stage 8, Kennaugh played a key role in Chris Froome's stage victory by helping to bring back a dangerous move by Nairo Quintana on the Port de Pailhères, the subsequent descent and beginning of the final climb to Ax 3 Domaines. However, on the following stage, Kennaugh was involved in a dramatic crash as Ryder Hesjedal, a  rider, knocked into him, sending him down a ravine and into vegetation next to the road. Although Kennaugh was not badly injured, the time lost meant he was unable to follow several subsequent attacks as Froome was left completely isolated.

2014

Kennaugh took his first individual professional win on the road at the Settimana Internazionale di Coppi e Bartali in March, winning the second stage at Sogliano al Rubicone, after going clear on the last climb of the day with Francesco Manuel Bongiorno of the  team and out-sprinted him for the honours. Kennaugh went on to win the race by 12 seconds ahead of teammate Dario Cataldo, who had taken 48 seconds out of him in the final  individual time trial.

In May 2014 Kennaugh broke Mark Cavendish's 2007 Isle of Man 10-mile time trial record by 30 seconds, setting a new record of 19m 38.982s at Ballamoar. Kennaugh won the British National Road Race Championships on 29 June, outsprinting Sky teammate Ben Swift in Abergavenny. Despite his good form Kennaugh was not selected for the Tour de France, instead riding the Tour of Austria, where he won the first stage and held the leader's jersey for the rest of the race to take his second stage race victory of the season. Kennaugh then competed for the Isle of Man at the Commonwealth Games in Glasgow, winning a silver medal in the points race on the track and eighth in the road race after a long solo breakaway attempt. Kennaugh rode the Vuelta a España, helping Chris Froome finish second overall.

2015

Kennaugh won the opening stage of the Critérium du Dauphiné after attacking on the final climb and holding off the charging main field by two seconds on the descent into the finish in Albertville. Kennaugh lost the race lead after the team time trial on Stage 3, but then helped Chris Froome win the event overall.

In June, he won the National Road Race Championships, distancing Mark Cavendish on the final cobbled climb and becoming the first rider to successfully defend the title since Roger Hammond in 2004. He was selected to ride the 2015 Tour de France, but struggled with illness and withdrew on Stage 16.

In September, Kennaugh broke Chris Boardman's time trial record for the  Isle of Man TT Mountain Course by six seconds, riding a standard racing bicycle. Boardman had recorded a time of 1hr 23min 54secs in 1993, a time which would prove to be the longest standing cycling record on the Isle of Man, until it was beaten by Kennaugh.

2016
Kennaugh began his season in Australia in January. He finished six seconds ahead of a group of 19 riders. The following week, Kennaugh rode the Herald Sun Tour. On the second stage, when he and teammate Chris Froome broke away to cross the line 17 seconds ahead of the field; Kennaugh won the stage and took the lead. The following two stages ended in sprints, during which Kennaugh increased his lead. On the final stage, Froome attacked on the penultimate ascent of Arthurs Seat, then attacked again on the final climb to win the stage and take the overall victory. Kennaugh was second, 29 seconds behind.

In May, Kennaugh crashed out of Stage 3 of the Tour of California, suffering a broken collarbone. Kennaugh had been originally named as part of Team GB's five-man team for the 2016 Summer Olympics, however, in July 2016 he withdrew, citing a lack of form, allowing Tour de France stage winner Steve Cummings to take his place.

Kennaugh was named on the startlist for the Vuelta a España. Team Sky won the opening team trial team time trial to Castrelo de Miño and as Kennaugh was the first rider to cross the line, he took the leader's Red Jersey, the first time he had led a Grand Tour in his career.

2017
In June, Kennaugh won stage 7 at the Critérium du Dauphiné, becoming the first British rider to take a stage victory on Alpe d'Huez. However, he was not included in the Team Sky squad for the 2017 Tour de France.

Bora–Hansgrohe (2018–2019)
In August 2017, he announced that he was leaving Sky and joining  on a two-year contract from 2018.
He started his season at the 2018 Tour Down Under.

Post-racing career
In 2019, Kennaugh joined ITV4's coverage of the Tour de France as a pundit alongside Gary Imlach, following the departure of Chris Boardman the previous year. Boardman returned as a pundit for the 2020 Tour, however Kennaugh continued his role alongside Boardman and Imlach.

Career achievements

Major results

Road

2006
 2nd Overall Junior Tour of Wales
 3rd Road race, National Junior Road Championships
2007
 National Junior Road Championships
1st  Road race
2nd Time trial
 1st  Overall Keizer der Juniores
 1st British National Junior Road Race Series
 3rd Overall Junior Tour of Wales
1st  Mountains classification
2008
 1st  Road race, National Under-23 Road Championships
 1st Trofeo Internazionale Bastianelli
 1st GP Capodarco
 1st Prologue (TTT) Tour Alsace
 2nd Road race, National Road Championships
 2nd Grand Prix of Wales
2009
 1st  Road race, National Under-23 Road Championships
 3rd Road race, National Road Championships
 3rd Overall Giro Ciclistico d'Italia
1st Stage 3
 4th Road race, UCI Road World Under-23 Championships
 8th Trofeo Internazionale Bastianelli
2010
 2nd Road race, National Road Championships
2011
 3rd Road race, National Road Championships
 3rd Overall Route du Sud
 5th Overall Tour de Pologne
2013
 1st Stage 1b (TTT) Giro del Trentino
 4th Road race, National Road Championships
2014
 1st  Road race, National Road Championships
 1st  Overall Settimana Internazionale di Coppi e Bartali
1st Stages 1b (TTT) & 2
 1st  Overall Tour of Austria
1st  Points classification
1st Stage 1
 8th Road race, Commonwealth Games
 10th Overall Bayern Rundfahrt
2015
 1st  Road race, National Road Championships
 1st Stage 1 Critérium du Dauphiné
 1st Stage 1 (TTT) Tour de Romandie
 6th Overall Vuelta a Andalucía
 9th Overall Tour of California
 9th Cadel Evans Great Ocean Road Race
2016
 1st Cadel Evans Great Ocean Road Race
 Vuelta a España
1st Stage 1 (TTT)
Held  after Stage 1
 2nd Overall Herald Sun Tour
1st Stage 1
 5th Overall Vuelta a Burgos
2017
 1st Stage 7 Critérium du Dauphiné
 4th Road race, National Road Championships
2018
 1st Grand Prix Pino Cerami
 3rd Tre Valli Varesine

Grand Tour general classification results timeline

Track

2006
 UCI Junior World Championships
1st  Scratch race
3rd  Team pursuit
 1st  Team pursuit, UEC European Junior Championships
2007
 UEC European Junior Championships
1st  Team pursuit
2nd  Scratch race
 1st  Team pursuit, UEC European Under-23 Championships
 National Junior Championships
1st  Individual pursuit
1st  Points race
3rd Scratch race
 1st UIV Cup, Gent Six Day (with Adam Blythe)
2008
 1st  Team pursuit, UEC European Championships
 1st UIV Cup, Berlin Six Day (with Jonathan Bellis)
 1st UIV Cup, Copenhagen Six Day (with Jonathan Bellis)
 2nd  Points race, UCI World Cup Classics, Cali
2009
 1st  Madison (with Mark Christian), National Championships
 UCI World Cup Classics
1st  Team pursuit, Ballerup
2nd  Madison (with Rob Hayles), Beijing
2010
 National Championships
1st  Scratch race
1st  Individual pursuit
2011
 1st  Team pursuit, UEC European Championships
 National Championships
1st  Madison (with Luke Rowe)
1st  Points race
 3rd  Team pursuit, UCI World Championships
2012
 1st  Team pursuit, Olympic Games
 1st  Team pursuit, UCI World Championships
2014
 2nd  Points race, Commonwealth Games
2017
 2nd Six Days of London (with Mark Cavendish)

World records

See also

 2012 Summer Olympics and Paralympics gold post boxes
 List of British cyclists

References

External links

 Peter Kennaugh profile at Team Sky
 
 
 Peter Kennaugh Profile at the Cycling Quotient
 

1989 births
Cyclists at the 2012 Summer Olympics
Cyclists at the 2014 Commonwealth Games
Living people
British male cyclists
Manx male cyclists
Medalists at the 2012 Summer Olympics
Members of the Order of the British Empire
Olympic cyclists of Great Britain
Olympic gold medallists for Great Britain
Olympic medalists in cycling
UCI Track Cycling World Champions (men)
British cycling road race champions
Commonwealth Games silver medallists for the Isle of Man
Commonwealth Games medallists in cycling
People from Douglas, Isle of Man
British track cyclists
Medallists at the 2014 Commonwealth Games